Sébastien Lefebvre  (born June 5, 1981) is a Canadian musician, who is best known as the rhythm guitarist and backing vocalist for the rock band Simple Plan. He has also released solo albums and duo work.

Equipment
Lefebvre currently uses Framus, specifically the Mayfield. He currently uses Mesa Boogie and Framus amplifiers. He uses a modified Boss chorus pedal and T-Rex Replica and Tremster.

Man of the Hour
In 2007, Lefebvre and Patrick Langlois from MusiquePlus created "Man of the Hour", a music podcast available on iTunes. The show includes fun facts and new music.

Solo projects
In early 2009, Lefebvre recorded an acoustic EP entitled You Are Here / Vous Êtes Ici. It was released on October 20, 2009, under Coalition Entertainment Inc. The first single "I Fall for You" was released on September 8, 2009. A music video was also released on YouTube, directed by Simple Plan bandmate, Chuck Comeau.

Lefebvre released a second EP, called Les Robots, in 2011. It was available for free upon release.

He released his third EP More Sake Por Favor in 2012.

Collaboration with Katie Rox
In November 2010, Lefebvre and fellow Canadian musician Katie Rox released an EP entitled, Christmas Etc...

Production
Lefebvre has accumulated a number of production and songwriting credits, including on Canadian singer-songwriter Andee's debut album Black and White Heart. The lead single from the album, "Never Gone" won an Anglophone Song Award from SOCAN Montréal in 2015. Lefebvre has also produced Wilfred Le Bouthillier's fourth album, Je poursuis ma route and self-produced a Simple Plan cover of No Use for a Name's song "Justified Black Eye" for the Tony Sly tribute album, The Songs of Tony Sly: A Tribute.

Discography

Albums

With Simple Plan
 No Pads, No Helmets...Just Balls (2002)
 Still Not Getting Any... (2004)
 Simple Plan (2008)
 Get Your Heart On! (2011)
 Taking One for the Team (2016)
 Harder Than It Looks (2022)

You Are Here/Vous Etes Ici (2009)

Les Robots (2011)

More Sake Por Favor (2012)

Sébastien & Katie Rox
Christmas Etc... (2010)

Filmography

Director

Simple Plan: Self Titled DVD (2008)
Simple Plan: Still Not Getting Any... DVD (2004)
Simple Plan: A Big Package for You (2003)

Actor

References

External links

Official website

1981 births
Living people
French Quebecers
Canadian male voice actors
Canadian punk rock guitarists
Simple Plan members
Musicians from Montreal
Rhythm guitarists